John Miller (12 July 1840 – 22 September 1919) was an Australian politician who represented the South Australian House of Assembly multi-member seat of Stanley from 1884 to 1885, 1890 to 1893 and 1896 to 1902.

References

1840 births
1919 deaths
Members of the South Australian House of Assembly